Flint Mountain (Welsh: Mynydd-y-Fflint) is a small village seated in Flintshire, North Wales, approximately 12 miles west of the city of Chester, midway between Mold and Flint, and situated just off junction 33 of the A55 North Wales Expressway. Points of interest include the Coach and Horses pub, and recently developed football club Flint Mountain FC (now named Halkyn & Flint Mountain F.C.). In mid-2006, the population of Flint Mountain was 1,958.

On clear days to the north and east, The Wirral can be seen.

References 

Villages in Flintshire
Flint, Flintshire